The Little Grey Mouse is a 1920 American silent drama film directed by Edward LeSaint and starring Gladys Brockwell, William Scott, Frank Leigh, Nigel De Brulier, Golda Madden, and Nancy Caswell. The film was released by Fox Film Corporation on October 31, 1920.

Cast
Louise Lovely as Beverly Arnold
Sam De Grasse as John Cumberland
Rosemary Theby as Hedda Kossiter
Philo McCullough as Stephen Grey
Clarence Wilson as Henry Lealor
Gerard Alexander as Mrs. Lealor (as Mrs. Gerard Alexander)
Willis Marks as Old John
Thomas Jefferson (actor)

Preservation
The film is now considered lost.

See also
1937 Fox vault fire

References

External links

1920 drama films
Silent American drama films
1920 films
American silent feature films
American black-and-white films
Fox Film films
Lost American films
Films directed by James Patrick Hogan
1920 lost films
Lost drama films
1920s American films